Crassula  may refer to:
 Crassula, a succulent plants genus in the family Crassulaceae
 Crassula (bivalve), a bivalve genus in the family Mactridae